Nicole Watt, married surname Yam, (born April 28, 1985) is a Canadian former competitive figure skater. She is the 2001 Canadian national silver medalist and competed at the 2001 Four Continents Championships and three Grand Prix events.

Personal life 
Nicole Watt was born on April 28, 1985, in Melfort, Saskatchewan. When she was eight years old, she was diagnosed with Juvenile rheumatoid arthritis and began taking a powerful drug, which lessened but did not eliminate her symptoms. She is a national spokesperson for the Canadian Arthritis Society. Her name became Nicole Yam after marriage. As of July 2013, she is studying medicine at the University of Saskatchewan.

Career 
Watt began the CanSkate program at age seven or eight. She landed her first triple, a Salchow, when she was twelve. She first attracted national attention when she placed 4th on the senior level at the 2000 Canadian Championships. She was coached mainly by Dale Hazell and also trained with John Nicks in the summer of 2000.

In autumn 2000, Watt received two ISU Junior Grand Prix assignments, competing in Mexico and China. In January 2001, she won the senior silver medal at Canadian nationals. She was assigned to the 2001 Four Continents and finished 11th.

Watt made her senior Grand Prix debut the following season, competing at the 2001 Skate Canada International and 2001 Trophée Lalique. She was 4th at the 2002 Canadian Championships.

In late December 2002, her left knee was drained due to swelling caused by her arthritis. She withdrew from the 2003 Canadian Championships after competing in the qualifying and short programs. In February 2003, Watt said that her disease was in remission and that she was off her medication and training on ice 3–4 hours a day. Her condition subsequently deteriorated, causing her to leave skating and stay off the ice almost entirely for three and a half years until autumn 2008. Although she attempted to make a comeback, she did not qualify for the 2009 Canadian Championships.

Watt was one of the recipients of the 2004 Stacey Levitt Women and Sport and 2011 UCBeyond scholarships.

Programs

Competitive highlights
GP: Grand Prix; JGP: Junior Grand Prix

References

External links

 
 Nicole Watt at Tracings.net

Canadian female single skaters
1985 births
Living people
People from Melfort, Saskatchewan
Sportspeople from Saskatchewan